Birk Manufacturing is a privately owned manufacturing company based in East Lyme, Connecticut. Birk engineers and manufactures custom flexible thermal solutions and temperature sensor assemblies for multiple industries including the medical, defense, aerospace, semi-conductor, food service and commercial industries. Birk's main product offerings are Polyimide (Kapton) and Silicone Rubber flexible heating elements.

Birk specializes in engineering and manufacturing components for the most challenging applications, and performs all design and manufacturing at their headquarters in East Lyme, CT.

History 

Birk Manufacturing was formed in 1989 by Norman Birk, the current owner of Birk Manufacturing. Norman served as president of Birk Manufacturing for the company's first 21 years, guiding Birk from a "start-up" company to the industry leader it is today. Birk continues to grow and develop new products and innovations in thermal management.

Certifications 

Birk currently holds UL, CSA, AS9100, ISO 9001, ISO 13485 and ITAR certifications.

References

External links 

 birkmfg.com/homepage

Manufacturing companies based in Connecticut